Maximilian Dahlhoff (born 29 November 1992) is a German footballer who plays as a defender for SV Drensteinfurt.

Career
Dahlhoff made his professional debut for Rot Weiss Ahlen in the 3. Liga on 30 October 2010, coming on as a substitute in the 79th minute for Björn Kluft in the 4–1 home win against Wehen Wiesbaden.

References

External links
 Profile at DFB.de
 Profile at kicker.de
 SV Drensteinfurt statistics at Fussball.de

1992 births
Living people
People from Ahlen
Sportspeople from Münster (region)
Footballers from North Rhine-Westphalia
German footballers
Association football defenders
Rot Weiss Ahlen players
Sportfreunde Lotte players
3. Liga players
Regionalliga players